Ícaro Mello (22 October 1913 – 8 October 1986) was a Brazilian athlete. He competed in the men's high jump at the 1936 Summer Olympics.

References

1913 births
1986 deaths
Athletes (track and field) at the 1936 Summer Olympics
Brazilian male high jumpers
Olympic athletes of Brazil
Place of birth missing
20th-century Brazilian people